Hypericum sechmenii, commonly called  in Turkish which means Seçmen's St. John's wort in English, is a rare species of flowering plant of the St. John's wort family (Hypericaceae) that is found only in the Eskişehir Province of central Turkey. It was described by Turkish botanists Atila Ocak and Onur Koyuncu who named the species in honor of Özcan Seçmen, a fellow Turkish botanist. Formally described in 2009, the species was first collected in 2006 and has since been found in only two localities with an estimated population of less than 250.

Description 
It has yellow flowers with five petals that usually bloom in June and July.

Roots 
The outside of its roots has a very thick waterproof protective covering made of fats and wax called a cuticle. Directly beneath the cuticle are one to two bark-like layers (called the periderm) which are composed of several layers of dead cells. Beneath the periderm are several layers of thin-walled tissue cells called a cortex. The tissue of the roots is completely covered in elements of water transport tissue called xylem.

Stems 
The numerous smooth and hairless stems of Hypericum sechmenii have multiple layers. On the outside is a thin cuticle which then covers one layer of epidermis. Beneath this epidermis, there are several layers of oval-shaped peridermal cells consisting of a waxy substance called suberin which helps to waterproof the stems. Some cells in the periderm of the stems also contain inorganic minerals known as druse crystals which are thought by scientists to deter herbivory because of their toxicity. Beneath the periderm is the main growth tissue called vascular cambium which produces xylem and another transport tissue called phloem in inward and outward directions, respectively.

Leaves 
The leaves of Hypericum sechmenii attach directly to the stems, meaning they are sessile (with no leafstalks). They are roughly 2–5 millimetres (mm) long, and they densely overlap each other. The texture of the leaves is described as somewhat leathery (coriaceous). Leaves are either egg-like (ovate) with a broader base, or elliptic in shape with rounded tips and pointed bases (cuneate). There are numerous pale glands on the surfaces of the leaves, and a few black glands can be found on the margins (edges). These glands can be seen by the naked eye, though in order to see the pale glands the leaf may need to be held up to a light. The pale glands contain and excrete essential oil compounds, while the dark glands contain red-staining naphthodianthrones which deter some herbivorous insects.

On both sides of the leaves there are pores which regulate gas exchange, called stomata, and there is tightly packed photosynthetic tissue just below the epidermis. Some of the cells in this tissue also contain druse crystals. The central vein of the leaf is noticeably larger and more prominent than the lateral veins, giving the leaves a distinct midrib.

Inflorescence 
The inflorescences (flower clusters) grow on the ends of the stems and will typically have three to five flowers in an arrangement in which there are longer flower stems (pedicels) on the outer flowers than on the inner ones. This gives the cluster a level top creating a structure known as a corymb. The specialized bract leaves which surround the flowers are long and have glands and small hairs called cilia. Their edges also have glands and small hairs, similar to the bracts. However, they may have a few black or amber dots and amber colored lines which the bracts do not. The petals are bright yellow, like most species of Hypericum, and grow in a pentagon of five on each flower. On the edges of the petals are a few black glands as well.

The pollen grains of Hypericum sechmenii have three grooves in a triangular layout, and the overall shape of the grain is a slightly elongated sphere.

The seeds themselves have tiny, regular pits in the shape of small lines or ladders.

Similar species 
Hypericum sechmenii is morphologically similar to other Turkish species of Hypericum. In its original description, its similarity to Hypericum huber-morathii and Hypericum minutum was noted, and it has been closely compared to Hypericum thymopsis.

When compared to Hypericum minutum and H. huber-morathii, Hypericum sechmenii has differences in the leaves, flowers, and pollen grains. Its leaves are adjacent and overlapping, while the leaves of H. minutum and H. huber-morathii are opposite. Hypericum sechmenii has more flowers on an inflorescence (3–5) than H. minutum (1–3), and usually fewer than H. huber-morathii (3–12). The glands on its petals are also different, as it has amber dots and lines, whereas H. minutum has amber dots with no lines, and H. huber-morathii only sometimes black dots. 

Pollen grains are different among these three species. Hypericum minutum has tiny protrusions on the surface of its pollen called microspinae, which H. sechmenii lacks, and H. minutum has far fewer distinct grooves on its surface. H. sechmenii pollen grains are larger than H. minutum and smaller than H. huber-morathii. H. huber-morathii has a slightly larger region on its end where the grooves meet.

Anatomically, Hypericum sechmenii is similar to H. thymopsis despite not being as closely related. Both species have similar adaptations in their stomata which make them able to thrive in dry climates, and both have stomata on the upper and lower sides of their leaves. However, H. sechmenii has a thinner layer of palisade tissue and inner stem tissue made up solely of xylem, whereas H. thymopsis has softer, spongy pith tissue.

Taxonomy 
Hypericum sechmenii was first observed and collected by Turkish botanist Atila Ocak in 2006. The holotype of the species was first collected in that same year by Ocak in the district of Günyüzü and is now housed at Eskişehir Osmangazi University. Three years later, in December 2009, the species was formally described in volume 46 of the peer-reviewed journal Annales Botanici Fennici. Hypericum sechmenii was described by Ocak and Onur Koyuncu alongside Filiz Savaroglu and Ismuhan Potoglu, all Turkish botanists. The species was incorporated into the Flora of Turkey endemic species registry in 2011 alongside another recently described Hypericum species, Hypericum musadoganii.

In 1977, British taxonomist Norman Robson began a genus-wide monograph of Hypericum which divided the genus into 36 sections, with almost every species in the genus being placed into one of these sections based on their morphology and phylogeny. However, Hypericum sechmenii was omitted from this original monograph, as it had not yet been identified as a unique species. After Hypericum sechmenii was described, it was then placed into the overall framework of the genus Hypericum by Robson in a later addition to his monograph. Robson corroborated the findings of Ocak and Koyuncu that H. sechmenii was its own species, taking note of its similarities to other Anatolian species of Hypericum, specifically Hypericum minutum and Hypericum huber-morathii. Because of this, Robson placed the species in a clade called the Huber-morathii Group which comprises five Turkish species of Hypericum and lies within the large section Adenosepalum. The placement of H. sechmenii can be summarized as follows:
Hypericum
Hypericum subg. Hypericum
Hypericum sect. Adenosepalum
subsect. Adenosepalum
subsect. Aethiopica
subsect. Caprifolia
Huber-Morathii group
H. decaisneanum
H. formosissimum
H. huber-morathii
H. minutum
H. sechmenii

Distribution and habitat 
Hypericum sechmenii is one of numerous species of Hypericum which are endemic to Turkey. Specifically, the species is endemic to central Turkey in northwestern Anatolia, in Eskişehir Province. The species is known only from two separate localities, one near the peak of Arayit Mountain, and the other between the towns of Kaymaz and Sivrihisar. The area of distribution on Arayit Mountain is estimated to be 2 square kilometres (km2) (equivalent of about 1.2 square miles (mi2)). The area of the Kaymaz to Sivrihisar location is estimated to be less.

The species' habitat is usually in and among the crevices of limestone rocks and outcroppings. Several other specimens of H. sechmenii have been collected since the species' discovery, being preserved at various Turkish herbariums.

Ecology 
Very little research has been conducted regarding the ecology of Hypericum sechmenii and its relationship with its environment. The plant usually flowers from June to July, and it fruits in July.

The leaves of Hypericum sechmenii contain xeromorphic stomata, which are stomata that have developed adaptations to allow the plant to better survive in its arid, steppe habitat of Central Anatolia, defined as the Irano-Turanian floristic region. H. sechmenii has adaptations of the genus Hypericum which deter grazing, especially from herbivorous insects. The first is the presence of numerous dark glands on the leaf margins which contain compounds that are toxic to creatures attempting to consume the plant. The second is the presence of druse crystals in many cells of the stem and leaf tissue. These contain minerals that are also thought to deter some insects from grazing.

Hypericum sechmenii is found in and among a number of other plant species. Specifically, it grows alongside small shrubs and perennial herbs like stonecress (Aethionema subulatum), woodruff (Asperula nitida), harebell (Asyneuma compactum), small toadflax (Chaenorhinium minus), Kotschy's damask flower (Hesperis kotschyi), flax (Linum cariense), restharrow (Ononis adenotricha), dandelions (Scorzonera tomentosa), Turkish catchfly (Silene falcata), and wood betony (Stachys lavandulifolia). It is found among only one other Hypericum species, which is Hypericum confertum.

Conservation 
The species is under threat from both abiotic factors, especially climate change, as well as human impact from agriculture and the grazing of domesticated animals. Because of these threats and the unhealthy population of Hypericum sechmenii, it was recommended by biologist Koray Yaylaci in 2013 that the species be classified as Critically Endangered by the International Union for Conservation of Nature (IUCN), although no conservational measures had been taken .

References 

sechmenii
Flora of Asia
Endemic flora of Turkey
Plants described in 2009